Kunjali Marakkar (alternatively spelled Kunhali Marakkar) was the title inherited by the Admiral of the fleet of the Samoothiri / Zamorin, the king of Kozhikode / Calicut, in present-day Kerala, India. There were four Marakkars whose war tactics defended against the Portuguese invasion from 1520 to 1600. The Kunjali Marakkars are credited with organizing the first naval defense of the Indian coast.

Origins of Marakkar

Against the Portuguese Empire

The Kunjali IV had rescued a Chinese boy, called Chinali, who had been enslaved on a Portuguese ship. The Kunjali was very fond of him, and he became one of his most feared lieutenants, a Muslim and enemy of the Portuguese. The Portuguese were terrorized by the Kunjali and his Chinese right-hand man, eventually, after the Portuguese allied with Calicut's Samorin, under André Furtado de Mendonça they attacked the Kunjali and Chinali's forces, and they were handed over to the Portuguese by the Samorin after he reneged on a promise to let them go. Diogo do Couto, a Portuguese historian, questioned the Kunjali and Chinali when they were captured. He was present when the Kunjali surrendered to the Portuguese and was described: "One of these was Chinale, a Chinese, who had been a servant at Malacca, and said to have been the captive of a Portuguese, taken as a boy from a fusta, and afterwards brought to Kunhali, who conceived such an affection for him that he trusted him with everything. He was the greatest exponent of the Moorish superstition and enemy of the Christians in all Malabar, and for those taken captive at sea and brought thither he invented the most exquisite kinds of torture when he martyred them." However, de Couto's claim that he tortured Christians was questioned, since no other source reported this, and is dismissed as ridiculous.

Key events

Marakkar Kotta
François Pyrard de Laval referred Marakkar IV as "the greatest corsair ever seen on those parts". The metropolis of Malabar pirates is what foreigners called the Marcaire Coste (Marakkar Kotta). His district was "large, men came from all sides to reside there". Their first fortress was small, a river flowed past it and at the mouth of the river Marakkar IV built "a large fortress" in "the  Malayalam fashion" with permission from Samoothiri, and beyond that he built two more forts on either sides of the river mouth to safeguard the entering vessels. The first fortress "almost surrounded by the sea and the river" protected the town from seas-side and land-side. According to Diogo do Couto, the Portuguese called the fortress Cognaily's Country (Kunjali's Country). It was situated two leagues away from Badara (Vadakara) and 10 leagues from Calicut. The fortress was besieged by the Portuguese in 1600. Within the Marcaire Coste there was an organisation for collecting customs duty, clerks and officers of the Samoothiri always stationed there at a custom-house, they examined all vessels and goods arrived at the port. Such a practice also prevailed in Calicut, registering the goods, Pyrard called the system "most admirable". Malabar pirates had four harbours under the ambit of the Samoothiri, there they built their galleys. These harbours were Moutingue (Muttungal), Badara (Vadakara), Chombaye (Chambal), and Cangelotte (Kaniyaram Kottu). They were fortified only on the seas-side under the patronage of Samoothiri, who granted these ports to Marakkar family who fortified them. These ports were two leagues from each other. Portuguese made multiple attempts to conquer these fortified ports, without effect or to their own loss, mainly at Badara.

Legacy
 There is a temple dedicated to "Kunjali Maraikkayar" at Madhavan Kurichi village in Thoothukudi district of Tamil Nadu. Known as perumal temple, it is situated near to Manapad which was a Portuguese stronghold in the 16th century. Villagers worship Maraikkayar as a deity and observe annual festivals. Stories of Maraikkayar are part of their Villu Paatu songs.
 Cochin University of Science and Technology in Cochin, Kerala, India, started a  Marine Engineering department named after Kunjali II as Kunjali Marakkar School of Marine Engineering in 2003.
 The Indian Navy shore-based naval air training centre at Colaba, Mumbai is named Naval Maritime Academy INS Kunjali II in honour of the second Marakkar.
 The Indian Department of Post issued a Rupee 3 colour stamp commemorating the maritime heritage of Kunjali Marakkar on 17 December 2000 on the 400th anniversary of the end of the Marakkars.  The stamp design shows the war-paroe, a small craft used by the Kunjalis, which, manned by just 30–40 men each, could be rowed through lagoons and narrow waters. Several of these crafts were deployed at strategic points and they would emerge from small creeks and inconspicuous estuaries, attack the Portuguese ships at will, inflict heavy damage and casualties by setting fire to their sails and get back into the safety of shallow waters. In these guerilla raids, the Marakkars had shown remarkable prowess.
 At Iringal, a village about 35 km north of Kozhikode, a small museum has been built in a hut that used to belong to the Marakkar family, with collection of ancient swords, cannonballs and knives.  This is maintained by the State Archeology Dept .
 The Kunjali Marakkar Centre for West Asian Studies at Calicut University is named in honour of Kunjali Marakkar.

In popular culture
In 1967, S. S. Rajan made the Malayalam film Kunjali Marakkar starring Kottarakkara Sreedharan Nair in the title role. The film won the National Film Award for Best Feature Film in Malayalam.
In 2010, a Malayalam television serial made by Sree Movies, directed by Vayalar Madhavankutty was telecast on Asianet, titled Kunjalimarakkar, starring Pradeep Chandran as in the title role.
Priyadarshan directed the film Marakkar: Lion of the Arabian Sea (2021) starring Mohanlal as Mohammed Ali, Kunjali Marakkar IV. It was produced on a budget ₹100 crore, making it the most expensive Malayalam film ever. The film won the National Film Award for Best Feature Film at the 67th National Film Awards.

See also
Tuhfat Ul Mujahideen
Mayimama Marakkar

References

Further reading
 India's naval traditions: the role of Kunhali Marakkars – K. K. N. Kurup, Northern Book Centre, 1997
 Gundert, Herman Keralappalama (History of Malabar from A.D. 1498 – 1531) in Malayalam, first published 1868, Kottayam: Vidyarthi Mithram, 1964
 Mathew, K.S. Portuguese Trade with India in the sixteenth century
 Queyroz Fr. The Temporal and Spiritual Conquest of Ceylaö,
 

History of Kerala
Malayali people
Indian Muslims
People from Kozhikode
Mappilas
Naval history of India